Gosse Ludigman (elected 989  died in 1000) was a legendary potestaat (or elected governor) of Friesland, now a province of the Netherlands. He does not appear in sources until hundreds of years after his supposed life.

Gosse lived at Staveren, and was married to Tetta Brederode.  In the chronicle of Egmond, by the fifteenth century Carmelite John of Leiden, he said. "Hij leefde ten tijde van graaf Arnoud , die zichzelf graaf van Oostergo en Westergo noemde zonder ooit enig gezag te hebben uitgeoefend". He lived at the time of Count Arnoud who proclaimed himself count of Oostergo and Westergo without ever having any authority.

His predecessor was Igo Galema and after his death he was replaced with Saco Reinalda.

Potestaats of Friesland
1000 deaths
Year of birth unknown